Ozyorny is a rural locality (a selo) in Simskoye Rural Settlement, Yuryev-Polsky District, Vladimir Oblast, Russia. The population was 2 as of 2010.

Geography 
Ozyorny is located 29 km north of Yuryev-Polsky (the district's administrative centre) by road. Podlesny is the nearest rural locality.

References 

Rural localities in Yuryev-Polsky District